Anshu Jain (born 15 November 1979) is an Indian first-class cricketer who represented Rajasthan. He made his first-class debut for Rajasthan in the 1996-97 Ranji Trophy on 16 December 1996.

References

External links
 

1979 births
Living people
Indian cricketers
Rajasthan cricketers